Hõne is a Jukunoid language spoken in Gombe State and Taraba State, Nigeria. Speakers of the two dialects, Pindiga and Gwana, can only understand each other with difficulty. It belongs to the Jukun Wapan (Kororofa) language cluster.

Distribution
Hõne is spoken in Akko, Billiri, Shongom, and Karim-Lamido LGAs. Ethnologue (22nd ed.) lists villages as:
Futuk, Kaltanga, Kashere, Pindiga, and Tumu villages (Pindiga dialect)
Andamin, Digare, Dizi, Gobirawa, Gwana, Jukon, Kasan Dare, Katagum, Konan Kuka, and Kwaya villages (Gwana dialect)

References

Jukunoid languages
Languages of Nigeria